Paul Cantor (1945–2022) was an American literary and media critic.

Paul Cantor may also refer to:

Paul Cantor (Canadian lawyer) (1942–2018), Canadian lawyer and executive

See also
Paul Canter, co-founder of video game developer Vortex Software
Paul Kantor (disambiguation)